General Sherman is a giant sequoia (Sequoiadendron giganteum) tree located at an elevation of  above sea level in the Giant Forest of Sequoia National Park in Tulare County, in the U.S. state of California. By volume, it is the largest known living single-stem tree on Earth. It is estimated to be around 2,200 to 2,700 years old.

While General Sherman is the largest currently living tree, it is not the largest historically recorded tree. The Lindsey Creek tree, with more than  almost twice the volume of General Sherman, was reported felled by a storm in 1905. Another larger tree, the Crannell Creek Giant, a coast redwood (Sequoia sempervirens) cut down in the mid-1940s near Trinidad, California, is estimated to have been 15–25% larger than the General Sherman Tree by volume.

History

The General Sherman Tree was named after the American Civil War general William Tecumseh Sherman. The official story, which may be apocryphal, claims the tree was named in 1879 by naturalist James Wolverton, who had served as a lieutenant in the 9th Indiana Cavalry under Sherman.

Seven years later, in 1886, the land came under the control of the Kaweah Colony, a utopian socialist community whose economy was based on logging. Noting the pivotal role that Sherman had played in the Indian Wars and his forced relocation of native American tribes, they renamed the tree in honor of Karl Marx. However, the community was disbanded in 1892, primarily as a result of the establishment of Sequoia National Park, and the tree reverted to its previous name.

In 1931, following comparisons with the nearby General Grant tree, General Sherman was identified as the largest tree in the world. One result of this process was that wood volume became widely accepted as the standard for establishing and comparing the size of different trees.

In January 2006, the largest branch on the tree (seen most commonly, in older photos, as an "L" or golf-club shape, protruding from about a quarter of the way down the trunk) broke off. The breakage is not believed to be indicative of any abnormalities in the tree's health, and may even be a natural defense mechanism against adverse weather conditions.

On September 16, 2021, the tree was wrapped in aluminum foil to protect it from the KNP complex fires.

Dimensions

While it is the largest tree known, the General Sherman Tree is neither the tallest known living tree on Earth (that distinction belongs to the Hyperion tree, a Coast redwood), nor is it the widest (both the largest cypress and largest baobab have a greater diameter), nor is it the oldest known living tree on Earth (that distinction belongs to a Great Basin bristlecone pine).

See also

 List of largest giant sequoias
 List of superlative trees
 List of individual trees
 List of oldest trees
 National Register of Big Trees

References

External links

 "What is the largest tree in the world?" Video of a park ranger at Sequoia National Park explaining details about the General Sherman Tree
 Norton, Marc. "The Karl Marx Tree: How Southern Pacific Railroad killed a socialist colony in the name of creating Yosemite National Park," Red Hills, August 27, 2014.

Individual giant sequoia trees
Tree
Sequoia National Park
Natural history of Tulare County, California
Oldest trees